The Throwback is a 1935 American Western film directed by Ray Taylor, written by Frances Guihan, and starring Buck Jones, Muriel Evans, George "Gabby" Hayes, Bryant Washburn, Eddie Phillips and Paul Fix. It was released on October 1, 1935, by Universal Pictures.

Plot

Cast 
Buck Jones as Buck Saunders
Muriel Evans as Muriel Fergus
George "Gabby" Hayes as Ford Cruze 
Bryant Washburn as Jack Thorne
Eddie Phillips as Milt Fergus
Paul Fix as Spike Travis
Charles K. French as Buck's Foster Father 
Frank LaRue as Tom Fergus
Robert Walker as Sheriff Carey 
Earl Pingree as Jim Saunders
Allan Ramsay as Young Buck Saunders
Margaret Davis as Young Muriel Fergus
Bobby Nelson as Young Milt Fergus 
Mickey Martin as Spike, as a boy
Silver as Silver

References

External links 
 

1935 films
American Western (genre) films
1935 Western (genre) films
Universal Pictures films
Films directed by Ray Taylor
American black-and-white films
1930s English-language films
1930s American films